Christine Elizabeth Toonstra (born 22 June 1966 in Amsterdam, North Holland) is a retired long-distance runner from the Netherlands, who represented her native country at the 1992 Summer Olympics in Barcelona, Spain. There she finished in eleventh place in the women's 10,000 metres event. She is a one-time national champion in the women's 5,000 metres. On top of this, between 1988 and 1996, she assembled five national titles altogether in various other events.

References
  Dutch Olympic Committee

1966 births
Living people
Dutch female long-distance runners
Dutch female middle-distance runners
Athletes (track and field) at the 1992 Summer Olympics
Olympic athletes of the Netherlands
Athletes from Amsterdam
20th-century Dutch women
21st-century Dutch women